The  or 13m landing craft was a type of landing craft, used by the Imperial Japanese Navy during World War II. It was a smaller version of the Daihatsu Class, with a bow ramp that was lowered to disembark cargo upon riding up onto the beach.

It was utilised by the Imperial Japanese Navy as a liberty and supply boat for cruisers, and as a lighter for transporting aircraft.

References
Jentschura, Hansgeorg; Jung, Dieter; and Mickel, Peter. Translated by Brown, J.D. 1977. Warships of the Imperial Japanese Navy, 1869–1945. Naval Institute Press. .
Military Monograph Series - Japanese Landing Craft of World War II. Merriam Press. 

Landing craft